Migliaccio is an Italian surname. Notable people with the surname include:

Dirce Migliaccio (1933–2009), Brazilian actress
Flávio Migliaccio (born 1934), Brazilian actor, film director and screenwriter
Giulio Migliaccio (born 1981), Italian footballer
Lucia Migliaccio (1770–1826), wife of Ferdinand I of the Two Sicilies
Oreste Migliaccio (1882–1973), American jazz pianist, composer and bandleader
Sergio Migliaccio (born 1974), Uruguayan footballer
Lance Migliaccio (born 1963), American actor, producer,videocast/podcast host, and political activist

References

Italian-language surnames